Stillwater Slough is a stream in the U.S. state of Nevada.

Stillwater Slough was named for the fact it often contains stagnant water.

References

Rivers of Churchill County, Nevada